Pambak or P’ambak may refer to:
Pambak, Gegharkunik, Armenia
Pambak, Lori, Armenia
Sipan, Armenia, formerly Pambak
Pambak (river), in northern Armenia
Pambak mountains